Kisenyama Dam  is a rockfill dam located in Kyoto Prefecture in Japan. The dam is used for power production. The catchment area of the dam is 0.9 km2. The dam impounds about 31  ha of land when full and can store 7227 thousand cubic meters of water. The construction of the dam was started on 1966 and completed in 1970.

See also
List of dams in Japan

References

Dams in Kyoto Prefecture